Microbrotula rubra, also called the red viviparous brotula, is a species of viviparous brotula endemic to the Hawaiian Islands.

The red brotula is translucent red in life and grows to a length of  SL. It is the type species of the genus Microbrotula.

References

Bythitidae
Fish described in 1953